Running Blind is a first person narrative espionage thriller novel by English author Desmond Bagley, first published in 1970 with a cover by Norman Weaver.

Plot
Ex-MI-6 spy Alan Stewart is coerced by his former masters into undertaking a very simple final mission: to deliver a small parcel to a man in Iceland. The mission should be simple for Stewart, as he happens to be fluent in Icelandic and has an Icelandic girlfriend.

However, things go very wrong, very quickly. Soon after his arrival in Iceland he is forced to kill a KGB agent who tries to take the package from him. Then, when Stewart tries to deliver the parcel he realises that he has been doublecrossed and that his former boss is now a double agent. Stewart sets off on a desperate race across some of the world’s most rugged, desolate and dramatic scenery, pursued by the KGB, the CIA and his own people, who now think that he has become a traitor. The secret lies in the mysterious parcel and his opponents are more than willing to kill him to prevent him from discovering what that secret is.

Television series 
In 1979 the BBC broadcast a three-part espionage thriller based on the novel and with the same title, starring Stuart Wilson, Ragnheiður Steindórsdóttir,  George Sewell and Vladek Sheybal, and featuring, among others, Ian McCulloch, Richard Hurndall, Ed Bishop, Joe Praml and Flosi Olafsson. It was made by BBC Scotland and largely filmed on location in Iceland.

External links
Crime Time review of Desmond Bagley
Fantastic Fiction site with publication history

References

1970 British novels
British spy novels
Novels by Desmond Bagley
Novels set in Iceland
William Collins, Sons books